Miss World 2005, the 55th edition of the Miss World pageant, was held on 10 December 2005 at the Crown of Beauty Theatre in Sanya, China. María Julia Mantilla of Peru crowned her successor Unnur Birna Vilhjálmsdóttir of Iceland. 102 contestants from all over the world competed for the crown. All contestants competed in three "fast track" events, Beach Beauty, Miss Talent, and Beauty With a Purpose contests. The winner of each competition immediately became one of the fifteen pageant semi-finalists. She becaming the third Icelandic woman to win Miss World.

Results

Placements

Continental Queens of Beauty

Judges

 Julia Morley – Chairwoman of the Miss World Organization
 Denise Perrier – Miss World 1953 from France
 Ann Sidney – Miss World 1964 from United Kingdom
 Lúcia Petterle – Miss World 1971 from Brazil
 Wilnelia Merced – Miss World 1975 from Puerto Rico
 Mariasela Álvarez – Miss World 1982 from Dominican Republic
 Julia Kourotchkina – Miss World 1992 from Russia
 Diana Hayden – Miss World 1997 from India
 Agbani Darego – Miss World 2001 from Nigeria
 Azra Akın – Miss World 2002 from Turkey

Contestants

Notes

Returns
Last competed in 1983:
 
Last competed in 1985:
  (as )
Last competed in 1999:
 
Last competed in 2001:
 
Last competed in 2003:

Withdraws
  – Claudia Mariza Manuel Santana
  – Saana Johanna Anttila – She withdrew at the last minute after a few days competing for unknown reasons.

No Shows
  – Nesrine Melbani
  – Lourdes Fernández
  – Miss Kazakhstan 2005, Dina Nuraliyeva did not compete for unknown reasons. However she participated in Miss Universe 2006 and Miss World 2009 where she became Top 16.
  – Cheong Wai Nei
  – Emilce Rossana Gómez Cabral 
  – Rhea Bessette
  – Edwige Grace Madzé Badakou – Due to lack of Sponsorship and visa problems. She won Miss World Cup 2006  later.
  – Kelly Eastwood
  – Lorraine Maphala – Due lack of Sponsorship and visa problems. However she participated a year later at Miss World 2006.

Following countries were never confirmed their participation
  – No contest
  – Isabella Stangl
  – No contest due to the fact that the Miss Belarus contest is a bi-annual pageant.
  – No contest
  – No contest
  – No contest
  – Rychacviana Coffie
  – Meriam George
  – Lissa Sáenz – Due to Sponsorship problems.
  – No contest

Replacements
  – Nicole Temené
  – Antonia Schmitz
  – Miss South Africa 2005 & Top 15 at Miss Universe 2005, Claudia Henkel was unable to participate because she had to crown her successor 2 days after the Miss World 2005 contest.
  – Miss Thailand World 2005, Angela (Aschara) McKay resigned her title just 10 days after winning because she wanted to pursue her studies and modeling work in New York City. 1st Runner-up, Sirinda (Cindy) Jensen took over the Miss Thailand World 2005 title.

References

External links
 Pageantopolis – Miss World 2005

Miss World
2005 in China
2005 beauty pageants
Beauty pageants in China
December 2005 events in China